Selseleh County is in Lorestan province, Iran. The capital of the county is the city of Aleshtar. At the 2006 census, the county's population was 73,819 in 15,531 households. The following census in 2011 counted 73,154 people in 18,231 households. At the 2016 census, the county's population was 75,559 in 21,140 households. The county is populated by Kurds.

Administrative divisions

The population history of Selseleh County's administrative divisions over three consecutive censuses is shown in the following table. The latest census shows two districts, six rural districts, and two cities.

References

 

Counties of Lorestan Province